The Mazhilis of the Parliament of the Republic of Kazakhstan of the 5th convocation was the legislative term of the lower house of the Parliament of Kazakhstan which was held from 20 January 2012, until its dissolution on 20 January 2016. The convocation was succeeded by the 6th Mazhilis on 25 March 2016.

The 5th Mazhilis was formed after the 2012 Kazakh legislative election which took place on 15 January 2012 where 98 members of the Mazhilis were elected based on the party list through proportional representation, while the 9 seats are reserved to the indirectly elected members of the Assembly of People.

Structure

Members

References 

Convocations of the Mazhilis